Morelotia is a genus of flowering plants belonging to the family Cyperaceae.

It is native to New Zealand and the Hawaiian Islands.

The genus name of Morelotia is in honour of Simon Morelot (1751–1809), a French apothecary and also member and professor at the college of pharmacy.
It was first described and published in Voy. Uranie on page 416 in 1829.

Known species
According to Kew:
Morelotia affinis 
Morelotia gahniiformis

References

Cyperaceae
Cyperaceae genera
Plants described in 1829
Flora of New Zealand
Flora of Hawaii